Elections to the Massachusetts Senate were held during 1824 to elect State Senators. Candidates were elected at the county level, with some counties electing multiple Senators.

For election, a candidate needed the support of a majority of those voting. If a seat remained vacant because no candidate received such majority, the Massachusetts General Court was empowered to fill it by a majority vote of its members. If more candidates received majorities than there were seats, the top finishers were elected.

Results were certified or rejected by the Governor's Council.

Apportionment 
The apportionment of seats by population was as follows:

 Barnstable County: 1
 Berkshire County: 2
 Bristol and Dukes Counties: 3
 Franklin County: 2
 Essex County: 6
 Hampden County: 2
 Hampshire County: 2
 Middlesex County: 5
 Nantucket County: 1
 Plymouth County: 2
 Suffolk County: 6
 Worcester County: 5

Results

Barnstable 

 

Exact totals for Marston are unknown.

Berkshire 

 
 
 

Results from Egremont, Florida, and Mount Washington were excluded from the official totals.

Bristol and Dukes

 
 

 
 
 

Results from Seekonk were rejected, "it appearing by said return that the meeting was held in 1804."

Essex 

 
 
 
 
 
 
 
 
 
 
 
 
 

Exact totals for the Federalist ticket were not listed.

Franklin 

 
 
 
 
 
 

Although Grinnell received a majority of the votes received, 33 votes for Grinnell, 20 votes for Longley and 9 votes for Hoyt were rejected from Erving's Grant were rejected by the Governor's Council, "it not being a town or district." Erving's Grant was unincorporated until 1838.

General Court

Hampden 

 
 
 
 
 
 
 
 

Results from Chester were rejected, "there being two returns from the same town." The exact totals for Chester are not known.

Hampshire 

 
 
 
 
 
 
 
 
 
 
 

Results from Chester were rejected, "there being two returns from the same town." The exact totals for Chester are not known.

Middlesex 

 
 
 
 
 
 
 
 
 
 

Exact totals for Federalist ticket are not listed.

The following men also received votes, though their exact totals are unknown:

Nantucket 

 
 

Burnell was a member of the Federalist Party but was also supported by the Democratic-Republicans.

Norfolk 

 
 
 

The following men also received votes as Federalist candidates, though their exact totals are unknown:

Plymouth 

 
 
 
 
 

Nathaniel Davis (Federalist), Charles Tuner (Republican), and William Davis (Republican) also received votes.

Suffolk

Worcester 

 
 
 
 
 
 
 
 
 
 

Exact totals for the Republican ticket are unknown. Many other candidates received votes throughout the county, but their exact totals are unknown:

See also
 1825–1826 Massachusetts legislature
 List of former districts of the Massachusetts Senate

References 

Senate 1824
Massachusetts
1824 Massachusetts elections
M
Massachusetts Senate